North & South – The Official Magazine of the Civil War Society was a military history and general history bi-monthly magazine published in the United States concerning the American Civil War 1861–1865. As its title states, it was the official magazine of the Civil War Society.  It was often referred to as just "North & South." Keith Poulter is the magazine's founder and editor. The headquarters was in Tollhouse, California.

Purpose
North & South was founded in 1997 with a focus on historical accuracy with frequent ground breaking topics. This is often done by discussion articles that is unique to this magazine. The book review section and "Crossfire" provide a mix of light and detail. It is considered an accurate historical magazine without a "pop" magazine feel.

Format
The magazine is an 8 inch by 10 inch color glossy cover with 65 to 85 magazine grade pages containing primarily black and white pictures related to the American Civil War with color pictures for a nice balance.

Articles
The magazine featured articles focus on historical people, weapons, battles or campaigns and events which describe the context in which the Civil War conflict was fought. They will typically include appropriate illustrations and an expanded bibliography for further reading. There can also be eyewitness accounts, and other war-related topics. The articles cover a diverse range of historical events prior to and after the American Civil War. The magazine also includes an editorial page and brief reviews of history books and simulations. The illustrations include maps, museum artwork, and photographs.

References

External links
 Official website
  American Civil War Society, Inc. website
  Civil War Memory - R.I.P. North & South Magazine

Bimonthly magazines published in the United States
American Civil War magazines
Defunct magazines published in the United States
Magazines established in 1997
Magazines disestablished in 2013
Military magazines published in the United States
1997 establishments in California
2013 disestablishments in California
Magazines published in California